Albert Leonard Oldman (18 November 1883 – 15 January 1961) was an English super heavyweight boxer in the 1908 Olympics in London for Great Britain.

Biography
Oldman was born in Mile End, London in 1883. His passage to Olympic gold was one of the smoothest ever as he knocked out his first rival within a minute. He received a bye in the semi-final and defeated Sydney Evans, his fellow Briton, in less than two minutes in the final.

Oldman, who served in the Royal Horse Guards, later became a policeman in the City of London Police. He emigrated to join the Ceylon force in 1910.

He died on 15 January 1961, at the age of 77, in Upminster, London.

References

External links
 
 
 
 

1883 births
1961 deaths
English male boxers
People from Mile End
Heavyweight boxers
Royal Horse Guards soldiers
Olympic boxers of Great Britain
Boxers at the 1908 Summer Olympics
English Olympic medallists
Olympic gold medallists for Great Britain
Olympic medalists in boxing
Medalists at the 1908 Summer Olympics
Boxers from Greater London